Franck Matingou (born 4 December 1979) is a former professional footballer who played as a midfielder. Born in France, he played for the DR Congo national team.

Club career
Matingou was born in Nice, France.

After a short trial at Dundee United, he returned to SC Bastia, when a transfer fee was demanded, but was subsequently released by Bastia in September 2006 to return once again on trial at United. Matingou also had a trial with AFC Bournemouth in February 2007.

International career
Matingou was part of the Congolese 2004 African Nations Cup team, who finished bottom of their group in the first round of competition, thus failing to secure qualification for the quarter-finals.

Career statistics

International

References

External links

1979 births
Living people
Association football midfielders
Footballers from Nice
Democratic Republic of the Congo footballers
French footballers
Democratic Republic of the Congo international footballers
French sportspeople of Democratic Republic of the Congo descent
FC Martigues players
SC Bastia players
Red Star F.C. players
Ligue 1 players
Ligue 2 players
2004 African Cup of Nations players
2006 Africa Cup of Nations players
Black French sportspeople